Pavel Fyodorovich Osipov (born 28 January 1996) is a Russian football midfielder.

Club career
He made his debut in the Russian Professional Football League for FC Zenit-2 Saint Petersburg on 4 August 2013 in a game against FC Torpedo Vladimir.

References

External links
 
 

1996 births
Footballers from Saint Petersburg
Living people
Russian footballers
Association football midfielders
FC Zenit-2 Saint Petersburg players
FC Lahti players
FK Ventspils players
FC SKA Rostov-on-Don players
Veikkausliiga players
Russian expatriate footballers
Expatriate footballers in Finland
Expatriate footballers in Latvia
FC Zenit Saint Petersburg players